Anglo American plc is a British listed multinational mining company with headquarters in London, England. It is the world's largest producer of platinum, with around 40% of world output, as well as being a major producer of diamonds, copper, nickel, iron ore and steelmaking coal. The company has operations in Africa, Asia, Australia, Europe, North America and South America.

Anglo American has a primary listing on the London Stock Exchange and is a constituent of the FTSE 100 Index. The company has a secondary listing on the Johannesburg Stock Exchange. In the 2020 Forbes Global 2000, Anglo American was ranked as the 274th -largest public company in the world.

History

1917–1990
Sir Ernest Oppenheimer, a Jewish German émigré, founded the Anglo American Corporation (AAC) in 1917 in Johannesburg, South Africa, with financial backing from the American bank J.P. Morgan & Co. and £1 million raised from UK and US sources to start the gold mining company; this fact is reflected in the company's name. The AAC became the majority stakeholder in the De Beers company in 1926, a company formerly controlled by Alfred Beit, also a Jewish German émigré.

In the late 1940s and 1950s, the AAC focused on the development of the Free State goldfields (seven major mines simultaneously) and the Vaal Reefs mine. During 1945, the AAC moved into the coal industry by acquiring Coal Estates. Twelve years later, Sir Ernest died in Johannesburg and was succeeded as head of the company by his son Harry, who also became chairman of De Beers.

In 1961, the AAC expanded outside of southern Africa for the first time and became a major investor in the Hudson Bay Mining and Smelting Company in Canada. In 1967, the company moved into the steel industry by acquiring Scaw Metals. From 1967 to 1975, it continued to grow and established a number of ventures, including the Mondi Group (timber, pulp and paper), Amgold (later AngloGold Ashanti) and then Amcoal (through the consolidation of several of its mining operations in South Africa; later known as Anglo Coal and in 2010 changed to Anglo Thermal). In 1982, Harry Oppenheimer retired as chairman of the AAC and was succeeded by Gavin Relly. Two years later, Oppenheimer retired from De Beers and passed the chairmanship to Julian Ogilvie Thompson, who in 1990 also became chairman and chief executive of the AAC.

1990–2010

On 24 May 1999, Anglo American Corporation merged with Minorco to form Anglo American plc, with its primary listing on the London Stock Exchange and a secondary listing on the Johannesburg Stock Exchange. Its gold mining operations were spun off into the separate AngloGold corporation, which in 2004 merged with the Ashanti Goldfields Corporation to form AngloGold Ashanti. Anglo American reduced its stake in AngloGold Ashanti to 16.6% in 2008.

In 2000, Julian Ogilvie Thompson retired as chief executive of Anglo American and was succeeded by Tony Trahar. Ogilvie Thompson also retired as chairman in 2002 and was replaced by Sir Mark Moody-Stuart. In the same year, Anglo American acquired Tarmac, a supplier of building materials, and Shell Petroleum Company's Australian coal assets. In 2001, De Beers was privatised after being a listed company for more than 70 years.

In 2002, South Africa's Mining Charter was approved, and Anglo American and other mining companies with operations in the country were mandated to transfer a percentage of their South African production to historically disadvantaged South Africans. From 2002 to July 2008 Anglo American carried out black community economic empowerment transactions (across all businesses with operations in South Africa) totalling R26 billion. Also, in 2002, Anglo Base Metals acquired the Disputada copper operations in Chile from ExxonMobil and opened a representative office in Beijing, China. In 2003, Anglo American acquired a majority stake in iron ore producer Kumba Resources.

In 2007, Cynthia Carroll succeeded Tony Trahar, becoming the first non-South African and first female chief executive of Anglo American. The Mondi Group, a paper and packaging business, was also spun out in 2007. During the next two years, Anglo American opened a representative office in New Delhi, India, acquired control of the Michiquillay copper project in northern Peru and the MMX Minas-Rio and Amapa iron ore projects in Brazil, and later acquired stakes in the Pebble copper project in Alaska.

Anglo American was also accused in 2007 of damaging environmental practices: in order to complete its planned Alaskan Pebble Mine in collaboration with Northern Dynasty Minerals, the company considered building a massive dam at the headwaters of the world's largest sockeye salmon fishery, which it would risk obliterating. Opponents also pointed to the use of cyanide, heavy metals, and acid mine drainage which can all have potentially devastating effects on the environment of the Bristol Bay area. Opponents of the Pebble Mine created Ballot Measure 4 to impose additional water quality standards on new large-scale mines in the state. However, in August 2007, Alaskans voted against the initiative. As of September 2008, the Pebble Limited Partnership had not yet put forward a project proposal and was working to prepare a prefeasibility study for the project in the second half of 2009. The mine proposal would still need to undergo environmental studies and the permitting process, including being subject to state and federal water protections. In December 2013, Anglo American withdrew from the Pebble Limited Partnership.

2010 to present
In early November 2011, Anglo American entered into talks with the Oppenheimer family to divest the latter's remaining shares of De Beers, whereby Anglo American acquired an additional 40% stake for $5.1 billion, increasing their overall stake to 85%. This came at a time of increased labour strikes and international attention to Oppenheimer's involvement in conflict diamonds. Anglo American then sold a 24.5% share in its Chilean copper unit, Anglo American Sur, to Japan's Mitsubishi Corporation for $5.39 billion, paid with a promissory note due on 10 November 2011. With this deal, the Anglo American Sur complex was valued at $22 billion.

In November 2012, Anglo American completed the sale of steel maker Scaw South Africa and its connected companies for a total of R3.4 billion in cash.

In July 2014, Anglo American said it was disposing of its 50% shareholding in Lafarge Tarmac, a building materials joint venture, to cement maker Lafarge SA for a value of not less than £885 million ($1.5 billion); the sale was subsequently completed in July 2015 for $1.6 billion. In October 2014, Anglo American's Minas-Rio iron ore project in Brazil began operating and shipping ore.

In July 2015, Anglo American announced that it would cut 53,000 jobs (35% of their workforce) and that in the first half of 2015, they had a financial loss of US$3 billion. In early December 2015, the company announced that, as part of a restructure, it would be cutting a further 85,000 mining jobs, nearly two-thirds of its work force of 135,000, worldwide. It also announced the consolidation of six of its divisions into three businesses, while dividend payouts to investors were also suspended for a year. The company also had its Dawson, Foxleigh and Callide coal mines in Central Queensland, as well as its Dartbrook coal mine in the Hunter Valley in New South Wales, put up for sale as its shares dropped to a record low on the London Stock Exchange, falling by more than 12 per cent.

In March 2017, British Indian industrialist Anil Agarwal purchased 11% of the company through his family trust Volcan. In September, he took the holding to 20% through another purchase worth about $1.5 billion. In April 2017, the company sold its Eskom-linked thermal coal operations in South Africa for $166 million, marking an important step in the mining giant's strategic overhaul to sharpen its focus on three commodities.

In October 2019, Anglo American announced a partnership with French energy company Engie to develop the world's largest hydrogen-powered mine haul truck, with testing expected to begin in 2020.

In January 2020, Anglo American made a 5.5p per share offer to buy a polyhalite fertiliser project (in North Yorkshire, England) from Sirius Minerals for £400m. In salvaging the financially troubled project, Anglo American envisages spending around £230m to keep construction going through to at least 2022. The sale was approved by shareholders in March 2020.

In April 2021, Anglo American announced the demerger of Thungela Resources, which will own a series of significant South African thermal coal assets, in order to eliminate the risk of clean-up liabilities.

In May 2022, Anglo American unveiled the world’s largest hydrogen powered mine haul truck at Mogalakwena PGM Mine in northeast South Africa. The project, which is expected to be fully implemented by 2026, is a first step in making eight of the company’s mines carbon neutral by 2030. The company has set a target of getting all of its operations to that status by 2040. President of the Republic of South Africa, Cyril Ramaphosa was present at the launch and stated, "Developing the hydrogen economy is a strategic priority for our country."

Operations
Anglo American focuses on natural resources with six core businesses: Kumba Iron Ore, Iron Ore Brazil, coal (thermal and metallurgical), base metals (copper, nickel, niobium and phosphates), platinum, and diamonds, through De Beers, in which it owns an 85% share. In 2008, the company had 105,000 permanent employees and 39,000 contract employees in its managed operations across 45 countries.

In 2008, Anglo American (excluding De Beers) spent $212 million on exploring 21 countries for resources including copper, nickel, niobium phosphates and zinc. The two main types of exploration for the company are greenfield and brownfield, with nearly 70% devoted to greenfield projects.

Anglo American, along with De Beers, backed the manufacturing of a superconducting quantum interference device (SQUID) to help improve the sensitivity of exploration surveys. Anglo American established Boart Products South Africa Limited in 1936 (later named Boart International) to turn the company's stockpile of boart, or low-grade natural diamonds, into drilling products. This initiative resulted in the development of the first mechanically set diamond drill bit and later led to additional research into cutting and abrasive tools.

In December 2010, following delays and high costs, Anglo American gained a key licence from the Brazilian government that would allow work to start on the Minas-Rio iron ore project. Production is initially expected to be 26.5 million tonnes per year; iron ore would be sent through a 525 km slurry pipeline to the Port of Açu. As of October 2014, Minas-Rio is operational and shipping ore.  
   
In July 2018, Anglo American announced that it would spend $5.3 billion on developing the Quellaveco copper mine in Peru, which the company acquired in 1992, with the Japanese conglomerate Mitsubishi funding 40% of the total cost. As part of the project, Anglo American also committed 650 million soles ($195 million) towards local community developments projects in Moquegua, where the Quellaveco mine is located.

Controversies

Toxic waste 
In October 2020, Anglo American was accused of being responsible for lead poisoning in possibly over 100,000 people. According to the lawyers, the claimants, principally young children, were suffering from high levels of lead poisoning. They claim the lead originated from the smelter, ore processing, and tailings dumps of the Kabwe mine in Zambia, which Anglo American South Africa had managed before the mine was nationalized in 1974. “Generations of children have been poisoned by the operations of the Kabwe mine, originally known as Broken Hill, which caused widespread contamination of the soil, dust, water and vegetation,” said the lawyers. Anglo American denies these allegations and has accused its successor ZCCM, which operated the mine after its nationalization in 1974. The class action certification hearing was held in February 2023 at the High Court of South Africa's Johannesburg branch.

In 2013, the companies involved in the Cerrejón coal mine in Colombia, were accused of increasing illness in approximately 13,000 people living close to the mine. Anglo American was also accused of failing to compensate people who had been displaced by its expansion. In September 2020, a UN human rights expert advised that Colombia discontinue the mine citing environmental and human rights concerns. In January 2021, the OECD launched an investigation into Cerrejón over human rights and environmental concerns. In February 2021, Anglo American announced plans to divest the Cerrejon mine by 2024. In June 2021, Anglo sued the Colombian government for preventing the development of the La Puente coal pit.

Carbon footprint
Anglo American reported Total CO2e emissions (Direct + Indirect) for 31 December 2020 at 16,080 Kt (-1,660 /-9.4% y-o-y).

See also

List of mining companies
List of companies traded on the JSE
List of companies of South Africa
Economy of South Africa
Mineral Policy Institute
Extractive Industries Transparency Initiative
International Council on Mining and Metals
United Nations Global Compact

References

External links
 

Diamond mining companies
Iron ore mining companies
Mining companies based in London
Mining companies of the United Kingdom
Mining companies of South Africa
Conglomerate companies of the United Kingdom
Companies based in London
British companies established in 1999
Non-renewable resource companies established in 1999
1999 establishments in England
Companies listed on the London Stock Exchange
Companies listed on the Johannesburg Stock Exchange
AngloGold Ashanti
De Beers
Oppenheimer family